|-
| Elezagići
| Gradiška
| Republika Srpska
|-
| Eminovo Selo
| Tomislavgrad
|
|}

Lists of settlements in the Federation of Bosnia and Herzegovina (A-Ž)